Julieta Cruz Navarette (born 4 June 1996) is an Argentine footballer who plays for Boca Juniors and the Argentina women's national football team.

Early life

Cruz was born in General Alvear in Mendoza Province. She played youth football on boys' teams until the age of 14.

Club career

River Plate
In 2014, Cruz joined River Plate aged 17. After a game against Porto Nuervo, she was diagnosed with paroxysmal supraventricular tachycardia. River declined to fund treatment and she departed the club.

Boca Juniors
In 2016, Cruz joined Boca Juniors. In August 2019, Cruz signed her first professional contract with Boca.

International career 

On 23 October 2021, Cruz made her debut for the Argentina national team in a 6–1 loss to Mexico at Estadio Gregorio "Tepa" Gómez.

Honours

Boca Juniors

References 

1996 births
Living people
Sportspeople from Mendoza Province
Argentine women's footballers
Women's association football defenders
Club Atlético River Plate (women) players
Boca Juniors (women) footballers
Argentina women's international footballers